GSAT-7 or INSAT-4F is a multi-band military communications satellite developed by the Indian Space Research Organisation. The Indian Navy is the user of the multi-band communication spacecraft, which has been operational since September 2013. According to defense experts, the satellite will enable the navy to extend its blue water capabilities and stop relying on foreign satellites like Inmarsat, which provide communication services to its ships.

Satellite
It is the first dedicated military communication satellite (unlike earlier dual use satellites) built by ISRO that will provide services to the Indian Armed Forces with the main user being the Indian Navy. Its procured launch cost has been put at ₹480 crore, with the satellite costing ₹185 crore. Cost of whole project per Memorandum of Understanding with ISRO was ₹950 crores. 

The multiple-band spacecraft will be used exclusively by the Navy to shore up secure, real-time communications among its warships, submarines, aircraft and land systems. GSAT-7/ INSAT-4F is said to significantly improve the country's naval operations around the world. 

After a flight of almost 34 minutes, the satellite was injected into a geosynchronous transfer orbit (GTO) of  perigee,  apogee and an inclination of 3.5 degree with respect to the equator.

ISRO launched a second satellite, GSAT-7A for Indian Air Force on 19 December 2018 on its Geosynchronous Satellite Launch Vehicle (GSLV-F11).

Launch
The satellite was launched early on 30 August 2013 atop an Ariane 5 ECA rocket from Kourou, French Guiana.

The 2.5-tonne spacecraft's antennae, including the ultra high frequency Helix antenna were deployed before it was stabilised on its three-axis in the orbit. All of the on-board transponders were switched on successfully on September 18, 2013

Capability

Rukmini will provide networking capabilities to various Indian Naval assets. During Theater-level Readiness and Operational Exercise (Tropex) in the Bay of Bengal in 2014, Rukmini was able to network about 60 ships and 75 aircraft seamlessly. Rukmini has a nearly 2,000 nautical mile 'footprint' over the Indian Ocean Region.

Replacement
The Indian Navy placed an order for GSAT-7R on June 11, 2019. GSAT-7R is expected to eventually replace GSAT-7.

See also 

 Indian military satellites
 GSAT-7A
 GSAT
 Indian National Satellite System
 List of Indian satellites

References

External links
 ISRO GSAT-7
 

GSAT satellites
INSAT satellites
Satellites orbiting Earth
Spacecraft launched in 2013
2013 in India